Celeb vagyok, ments ki innen! is the Hungarian version of I'm a Celebrity...Get Me Out of Here!. The hosts are Balázs Sebestyén and János Vadon.

Series

Season 1
Series 1 premiered 6 October 2008 on RTL Klub and ended 22 October 2008. It is shot in Argentina. There are ten contestants in reverse order of elimination. Bottom was the first out. Top was the winner.

Season 2
Following on from the huge success of the first series, a second series launched on 27 October 2008, just five days after the final of series one.

References

Hungarian television shows
2008 Hungarian television series debuts
2008 Hungarian television series endings
2000s Hungarian television series
Television shows set in Argentina
I'm a Celebrity...Get Me Out of Here!
RTL (Hungarian TV channel) original programming